Jindo Morishita (born 25 August 1995) is a Japanese footballer who plays as a forward for Accra Great Olympics. Besides Japan, he has played in the Netherlands, Zambia, and Ghana.

Career

Morishita started his career with Zambian side MUZA.

Before the 2021 season, he signed for Ebusua Dwarfs in the Ghana Premier League (GPL). On 9 April 2021, Morishita debuted for Ebusua Dwarfs during a 1–1 draw with Eleven Wonders, becoming the first-ever Japanese player in the GPL. However, he suffered relegation to the Ghanaian second tier.

References

Living people
1995 births
Japanese footballers
Association football forwards
Ghana Premier League players
Ebusua Dwarfs players
Japanese expatriate footballers
Japanese expatriate sportspeople in Zambia
Expatriate footballers in Zambia
Japanese expatriate sportspeople in Ghana
Expatriate footballers in Ghana